Pál Fried (16 June 1893 in Hungary – 6 March 1976 in New York City) was a Hungarian artist best known for his eroticized paintings of female dancers and nudes.

Life and career
Pál Fried was born in Budapest in 1893. He received his art education at the  Académie hongroise des arts (Hungarian Academy of Arts) where he was a pupil of Hugo Pohl who became one of his major influences. While under Pohl's direction, he executed many portraits of female nudes and Orientalist works. Later he studied in Paris at the Académie Julian, where he was the pupil of Claude Monet and Lucien Simone.<ref>Austo-Hungarian Orientalist Painters, Online: http://orientaliste.free.fr/biographies/artistes6.html, translated from French</ref> In Paris, he was greatly influenced by the French Impressionists, especially Pierre-Auguste Renoir and Edgar Degas. This inspired him to prepare many paintings of ballerinas, dancers and circus performers.

Fried emigrated to the United States in 1946 after World War II,  where he taught at the New York Academy of Art. He prepared portraits of American celebrities such as Marilyn Monroe. Through his work in portraiture, he gained considerable financial success.

He became a U.S. citizen in 1953. He lived in Los Angeles and New York City and died on 6 March 1976 in New York, NY.

Work
He worked in oils and pastels and experimented with light and movement. His oil paintings were usually of dancers, nudes, and portraits, and while his subjects were primarily female, he also painted Paris, seascapes, cowboys and landscapes of the American West as well as Orientalist subject matter. He signed his paintings, as is usual in Hungarian, with his surname first as "Fried Pál".  At times, this particular artist would make several, almost identical versions of the same oil painting, except he would use slightly different facial expressions and/or would try different colour schemes.

Select List of Paintings

 Parisian Street Scene Boy with Donkey Black Gloves The Dancer Can-Can La Belle Africane African Beauties Africa: Blue and Red Headscarves Moroccan Women before the Kasbah Three Ballerinas Pink Ballerina Sleeping Ballerina Night Club Dancer The Fan Bolero Willing to Learn Young Beauty in a Hat and Veil, 1940
 Washington Square Park, New York Rodeo Ride Girl with Parasol''

See also
 List of Orientalist artists
 Orientalism

References

1893 births
1976 deaths
20th-century American painters
American erotic artists
American male painters
American people of Hungarian-Jewish descent
Hungarian erotic artists
Hungarian Jews
20th-century Hungarian painters
20th-century American male artists
Jewish American artists
Jewish painters
Orientalist painters
Modern painters
Hungarian emigrants to the United States
Artists from Budapest
People with acquired American citizenship
Hungarian male painters
20th-century American Jews
20th-century Hungarian male artists